Kymäläinen is a Finnish surname. Notable people with the surname include:

Pauno Kymäläinen (born 1949), Finnish footballer
Suna Kymäläinen (born 1976), Finnish politician

Finnish-language surnames